The Honeymooners is an American television sitcom which originally aired from 1955 to 1956, created by and starring Jackie Gleason, and based on a recurring comedy sketch of the same name that had been part of Gleason's variety show. It follows the lives of New York City bus driver Ralph Kramden (Gleason), his wife Alice (Audrey Meadows), Ralph's best friend Ed Norton (Art Carney) and Ed's wife Trixie (Joyce Randolph) as they get involved with various schemes in their day-to-day living.

Most episodes revolve around Ralph's poor choices in absurd dilemmas which frequently show his judgmental attitude in a comedic tone. The show occasionally features more serious issues such as women's rights and social status. The sketches first aired on the DuMont network's variety series Cavalcade of Stars, which Gleason hosted, and subsequently on the CBS network's The Jackie Gleason Show which was broadcast live in front of a theater audience.

The popularity of the sketches led Gleason to rework The Honeymooners as a filmed half-hour series which debuted on 1 October 1955 on CBS, replacing the variety series. It was initially a ratings success as the No. 2 show in the United States, facing stiff competition from The Perry Como Show on NBC. Gleason's show eventually dropped to No. 19, and production ended after 39 episodes (now referred to as the "Classic 39 episodes").

The final episode of The Honeymooners aired on 22 September 1956, and Gleason sporadically revived the characters until 1978. The Honeymooners was one of the first U.S. television shows to portray working-class married couples in a gritty, non-idyllic manner, as the show is mostly set in the Kramdens' kitchen in a neglected Brooklyn apartment building. One of the sponsors of the show was Buick.

Cast and characters
The majority of The Honeymooners episodes focus on four principal characters and generally use fixed sets within their Brooklyn apartment building. Although various secondary characters make multiple appearances and occasional exterior shots are incorporated during editing, virtually all action and dialogue is "on stage" inside the normal backdrop.

Ralph Kramden
Played by Jackie Gleason—a bus driver for the fictional Gotham Bus Company based in New York City. He is never seen driving a bus (except in publicity photos), but he sometimes is shown at the bus depot. Ralph is frustrated by his lack of success and often develops get-rich-quick schemes. He is very short-tempered, frequently resorting to bellowing, insults, and hollow threats. Well hidden beneath the many layers of bluster, however, is a softhearted man who loves his wife and is devoted to his best pal, Ed Norton. Ralph enjoys bowling and playing pool; he's proficient at both, and he is an enthusiastic member of the Loyal Order of Raccoons (although in several episodes, a blackboard at the lodge lists his dues as being in arrears). Ralph's mother rarely is mentioned, although she does appear in one episode. Ralph's father is only mentioned in one episode ("Young Man with a Horn") as having given Ralph a cornet he learned to play as a boy, and Ralph insists on keeping the cornet when Alice suggests it be thrown away.

The Ralph character was given honorary membership in the real New York City bus drivers' union (Local 100 of the Transport Workers Union) during the run of the show, and a Brooklyn bus depot was named in Gleason's honor after his death. Ralph Kramden was the inspiration for the animated character Fred Flintstone. An eight-foot-tall bronze statue of a jolly Jackie Gleason in the bus driver's uniform was also erected in 1999 in front of Manhattan's midtown Port Authority Bus Terminal. TV Land funded the statue in cooperation with Gleason's estate and the Port Authority.

Alice Kramden 
Alice (née Alice Gibson), played in the first nine skits from 1951 to January 1952 by Pert Kelton, and by Audrey Meadows for all remaining episodes, is Ralph's patient but sharp-tongued wife of 14 years. She often finds herself bearing the brunt of Ralph's tantrums and demands, which she returns with biting sarcasm. She is levelheaded, in contrast to Ralph's pattern of inventing various schemes to enhance his wealth or his pride. She sees his schemes' unworkability, but he becomes angry and ignores her advice (and by the end of the episode, her misgivings almost always prove correct). She has grown accustomed to his empty threats—such as "One of these days, POW!!! Right in the kisser!", "BANG, ZOOM!" or "You're going to the Moon!"— to which she usually replies, "Ahhh, shaddap!"  Alice runs the finances of the Kramden household, and Ralph frequently has to beg her for money to pay for his lodge dues or crazy schemes. Alice studied to be a secretary before her marriage and works briefly in that capacity when Ralph is laid off. Wilma Flintstone is based on Alice Kramden.

Another foil for Ralph is Alice's mother, who is even sharper-tongued than her daughter and despises Ralph as a bad provider. Alice's father is occasionally mentioned, but never seen. Alice's sister Agnes appears in episode 22, "Here Comes The Bride". (Ralph jeopardizes his newlywed sister-in-law's marriage after giving some bad advice to the groom, but it all works out in the end). Ralph and Alice lived with her mother for six years after getting married before they got their own apartment. In a 1967 revival, Ralph refers to Alice (played by Sheila MacRae in 1966–70 and once more in 1973) as being one of 12 children, and to her father as never working.

The Honeymooners originally appeared as a sketch on the DuMont Network's Cavalcade of Stars, with the role of Alice played by Pert Kelton (1907–1968). When his contract with DuMont expired, Gleason moved to the CBS network where he had The Jackie Gleason Show, and the Alice role went to Audrey Meadows because Kelton had been blacklisted. According to playwright Arthur Miller, a family friend, writing many years later in his autobiography Timebends: A Life, extensive inquiries finally revealed that her blacklisting was due to the fact that her husband Ralph had, many years earlier, marched in a May Day parade. “Ralph, I knew, had absolutely no leftist connections whatever but had simply thrown himself in with a gang of actors protesting whatever it was that year, and Pert had never even voted in her life”.

The character's name is mentioned in the 1998 American stoner comedy film Half Baked in the lyrics to the song by the movie's character “Sir Smoka-Alot”.

Edward Lillywhite/Ethelbert "Ed" Norton

Played by Art Carney; a New York City municipal sewer worker and Ralph's best friend (and upstairs neighbor). He is considerably more good-natured than Ralph, but nonetheless trades insults with him on a regular basis. Ed (typically called "Norton" by Ralph and sometimes by his own wife, Trixie) often gets mixed up in Ralph's schemes. His carefree and rather dimwitted nature usually results in raising Ralph's ire, while Ralph often showers him with verbal abuse and throws him out of the apartment when Ed irritates him. In most episodes, Ed is shown to be better-read, better-liked, more worldly and more even-tempered than Ralph, despite his unassuming manner and the fact that he usually lets Ralph take the lead in their escapades. Ed and Ralph both are members of the fictional Raccoon Lodge. Like Ralph, Ed enjoys and is good at bowling and playing pool.

Ed worked for the New York City sewer department, and described his job as a "Sub-supervisor in the sub-division of the department of subterranean sanitation, I just keep things moving along." He served in the U.S. Navy in World War 2, and used his G.I. Bill money to pay for typing school, but felt he was unable to work in an office because he hated working in confined spaces. The relatively few scenes set in the Norton apartment showed it to have the same layout as the Kramdens' but more nicely furnished. Though Norton makes the same weekly $62 salary as Ralph (roughly $ in current dollars), their higher standard of living might be explained by Norton's freer use of credit; at one point he admits to having 19 charge accounts.

Ed is the inspiration for Barney Rubble in The Flintstones, and for Yogi Bear (in terms of design, clothing, and mannerisms). In 1999, TV Guide ranked him 20th on its list of the "50 Greatest TV Characters of All Time." According to Entertainment Weekly, Norton is ranked 8th of the "greatest sidekicks ever."

Thelma "Trixie" Norton
Played most famously by Joyce Randolph; Ed's wife and Alice's best friend. She did not appear in every episode and had a less developed character, though she is shown to be somewhat bossy toward her husband. In one episode, she surprisingly is depicted as a pool hustler. On another episode, Ralph insults Trixie by making a reference to Minsky's (a famous New York City burlesque theater; the original Trixie character was an ex-burlesque dancer). There are a few references to Trixie's burlesque background in the lost episodes (e.g., Norton: "Every night I'd meet her backstage and hand her a rose ... . It was her costume!"). Randolph played Trixie as an ordinary, rather prudish, housewife, complaining to her husband on one occasion when a "fresh" young store clerk called her "sweetie pie." In a 1967 special, Trixie (played by Jane Kean from 1966–1970 and 1976–1978) resentfully denied Ralph's implications that she "worked in burlesque" to which he replied, "If the shoe fits, take it off."  Trixie is the inspiration for Betty Rubble in The Flintstones.

Elaine Stritch was the first and original Trixie Norton in a Honeymooners sketch with Jackie Gleason, Art Carney, and Pert Kelton. The ex-dancer character was rewritten and recast after just one episode with the more wholesome-looking Randolph playing the character as a housewife.

Others
Some of the actors who appeared multiple times on the show include George O. Petrie and Frank Marth as various characters, Ethel Owen as Alice's mother, Zamah Cunningham as apartment building neighbor Mrs. Manicotti, and Cliff Hall as the Raccoon Lodge president.

Ronnie Burns, son of George Burns and Gracie Allen, made a guest appearance on one episode. On another episode, Ed Norton makes a reference to a co-worker "Nat Birnbaum" (as in "'nat," a three-letter word for bug," says crossword puzzle aficionado Norton). George Burns's real name was Nathan Birnbaum.

The apartment house
The Kramdens and Nortons lived in an apartment house at 328 Chauncey Street in Bushwick, Brooklyn, New York City (sometimes referred to as Bensonhurst), a nod to the fact that Jackie Gleason lived there after his family moved from his birthplace at 364 Chauncey Street. In the 1955 episode "A Woman's Work is Never Done," the address is referred to as 728 Chauncey Street. The landlord of the apartment house is Mr. Johnson. In the Honeymooners episodes taped from 1967 to 1970, the address of the apartment house changed to 358 Chauncey Street, and the number of the Kramden apartment is 3B. The actual 328 Chauncey Street is located in the Stuyvesant Heights section of the borough, approximately eight miles northeast of the show's fictional location.

Apartment residents
 Mr. and Mrs. Manicotti: An older couple of Italian descent.
 Tommy Manicotti: He played stickball and contracted the measles. He also left his water pistol in the Kramdens' apartment.
 Garrity: A vocal upstairs neighbor with whom Ralph was frequently feuding. He fought with Ralph for disturbing the neighbors with practicing for The $99,000 Answer quiz show. But showing some humor in other episodes, he accused Ralph of renting the tuxedo for his sister-in-law's wedding from an undertaker, and loved Ralph's joke about "sending a knight out on a dog like this."
 Garrity Boy: He played stickball and contracted the measles.
 Mrs. Bennett: Needed her radiator fixed when Ralph was the janitor.
 Johnny Bennett: He played stickball, earned an apple for a home-run—and contracted the measles like the other boys.
 Mrs. Doyle: Mother of Tommy Doyle.
 Tommy Doyle: He was arrested for spending a $100 counterfeit bill that Ralph gave him to take his suits to the cleaners.
 Mrs. Stevens: She gave Alice a box for hairpins that was made of matchsticks for Christmas which was the same exact gift Ralph was about to give her but he vastly overpaid for it and thought he had a great gift rather than an insignificant trinket for Alice. Alice gave Mrs. Stevens a kitchen thermometer.
 Mrs. Olsen: She said that Ralph broke her Venetian blinds instead of repairing them when Ralph temporarily was the building janitor.
 Mrs. Hannah: Needed her bathtub fixed when Ralph was the janitor.
 Mrs. Fogerty: Accused Ralph of taking food out of her ice box when Ralph was the janitor.
 Mrs. Schwartz: The apartment house blabbermouth who reported that the Kramdens had set the all-time lowest gas bill for the building. She also was curious to know if the house phone was able to connect to Jersey when Ralph was the janitor.
 Mr. Riley: Had a full garbage can that needed to be emptied when Ralph was the janitor.
 Judy Connors: A teenager who did not want her father to meet a boy named Wallace, her date.
 Tommy Mullins: A U.S. Navy service member who was home on leave for Christmas.
 Carlos Sanchez: A mambo dancer who works at night.
 Mr. and Mrs. August Gunther: Former residents of the building. August hit it big with his doughnut business.
 Mr. Johnson: The building's landlord.

Plot
Most of The Honeymooners takes place in Ralph and Alice Kramden's small, sparsely furnished two-room apartment. Other settings used in the show included the Gotham Bus Company depot, the Raccoon Lodge, a neighborhood pool parlor, a park bench where Ralph and Ed occasionally meet for lunch, and on occasion the Nortons' apartment (always noticeably better-furnished than the Kramdens'). Many episodes begin with a shot of Alice in the apartment awaiting Ralph's arrival from work. Most episodes focus on Ralph's and Ed's characters, although Alice played a substantial role. Trixie played a smaller role in the series, and did not appear in every episode as did the other three. Each episode presented a self-contained story, which rarely carried over into a subsequent one. The show employed a number of standard sitcom clichés and plots, particularly those of jealousy, get-rich-quick schemes, and comic misunderstanding.

As to the occasional plot continuations, there were two such sequences—one concerning Ralph being sent to a psychiatrist because of "impatient" behavior during work that resulted in several passengers lodging complaints about his professional demeanor, and one that continued for two sequential shows in which Aunt Ethel visited and Ralph hatched a scheme to marry her off to the neighborhood butcher.

The series presents Ralph as an everyman and an underdog who struggles to make a better life for himself and his wife, but who ultimately fails due to his own shortcomings. He, often along with Ed, devises a number of get-rich-quick schemes, none of which succeed. Ralph would be quick to blame others for his misfortune until it was pointed out to him where he had fallen short. Ralph's anger then would be replaced by short-lived remorse, and he would apologize for his actions. Many of these apologies to Alice ended with Ralph saying in a heartfelt manner, "Baby, you're the greatest," followed by a hug and kiss.

In most episodes, Ralph's short temper got the best of him, leading him to yell at others and to threaten comical physical violence, usually against Alice. Ralph's favorite threats to her were "One of these days ... One of these days ... Pow! right in the kisser!" or to knock her "to the Moon, Alice!" (Sometimes this last threat was simply abbreviated: as "Bang, zoom!") On other occasions, Ralph simply told Alice, "Oh, are you gonna get yours." All of this led to criticism, more than 40 years later, that the show displayed an ironic acceptance of domestic violence. But Ralph never carried out his threats, and others have pointed out that Alice knew he never would because of their deep love for each other. In retaliation, the targets of Ralph's verbal abuse often responded by simply joking about his weight, a common theme throughout the series. Incidentally, Alice never was seen to back down during any of Ralph's tirades.

For the "Classic 39" episodes of The Honeymooners, there was no continuing story arc. Each episode is self-contained. For example, in the series premiere episode "TV Or Not TV," Ralph and Norton buy a television set with the intent to share it. By the next week's show, the set is gone although in later episodes a set is shown in the Nortons' apartment. In the installment "The Baby Sitter," the Kramdens get a telephone, but in the next episode, it is gone. And, in the episode, "A Dog's Life," Alice gets a dog from the pound which Ralph tries to return. But, in the end, Ralph finds himself growing to love the dog and decides to keep it along with a few other dogs. However, in the next episode, the dogs are nowhere to be seen and are never referred to again.

Occasionally, references to earlier episodes were made, including to Ralph's various "crazy harebrained schemes" from the lost episodes. Norton's sleepwalking in "The Sleepwalker" was referenced in "Oh My Aching Back." But, it was not until the 1967 "Trip To Europe" shows that a Honeymooners story arc is finally used.

History

Origins
In July 1950, Jackie Gleason took over as the host of Cavalcade of Stars, a variety show that aired on the struggling DuMont Television Network. After the first year, he and his writers Harry Crane and Joe Bigelow developed a sketch that drew upon familiar domestic situations for its material. Based on the popular radio show The Bickersons, Gleason wanted a realistic portrayal of life for a poor husband and wife living in Brooklyn, his home borough. The couple would continually argue, but ultimately show their love for each other. After rejecting titles such as "The Beast," "The Lovers," and "The Couple Next Door," Gleason and his staff settled on "The Honeymooners." Gleason took the role of Ralph Kramden, a blustery bus driver, and he chose veteran comedy movie actress Pert Kelton for the role of Alice Kramden, Ralph's acerbic and long-suffering wife.

"The Honeymooners" made its debut on October 5, 1951, as a six-minute sketch. Ensemble cast member Art Carney made a brief appearance as a police officer who gets hit with flour Ralph had thrown out the window. The tone of these early sketches was much darker than the later series, with Ralph exhibiting extreme bitterness and frustration with his marriage to an equally bitter and argumentative middle-aged woman (Kelton was nine years older than Gleason). The Kramdens' financial struggles mirrored those of Gleason's early life in Brooklyn, and he took great pains to duplicate on set the interior of the apartment where he grew up (right down to his boyhood address of 328 Chauncey Street). The Kramdens—and later the Nortons when those characters were added—are childless, an issue only occasionally explored, but a condition on which Gleason insisted. Ralph and Alice did legally adopt a baby girl whom they named Ralphina (because he actually wanted a baby boy he could name after himself but fell in love with the baby girl the agency had placed with them). However, the biological mother requested to have her baby returned, and the agency asked whether the Kramdens would be willing to do so even though they were the legal parents. Ralph agreed and stated that they would visit her and she would have a real-life Santa Claus every Christmas. A few later skits had Ralph mistakenly believe for a while that Alice was pregnant.

Early cast additions in later sketches were upstairs neighbors Ed and Trixie Norton. Ed (Carney) was a sewer worker and Ralph's best friend, although his innocent and guileless nature was the source of many arguments between the two. Trixie (maiden name never mentioned), Ed's wife, originally portrayed by Elaine Stritch as a burlesque dancer, but was replaced after just one appearance by the more wholesome-looking Joyce Randolph. Trixie is a foil to Ed, just as Alice is for Ralph, but derivatively, and almost always off-screen.

Due in part to the colorful array of characters Gleason invented (including the cast of The Honeymooners), Cavalcade of Stars became a huge success for DuMont. It increased its audience share from nine to 25 percent. Gleason's contract with DuMont expired in the summer of 1952, and the financially struggling network (which suffered through ten layoffs from July through October 1953) was unable to re-sign him so he moved on to CBS.

Move to CBS
CBS president William S. Paley in July 1952 made sure the cast of the former DuMont ensemble that was becoming The Jackie Gleason Show embarked on a highly successful five-week promotional tour across the United States, performing a variety of musical numbers and sketches (including the popular "Honeymooners"). However, actress Pert Kelton who played Alice Kramden and other roles, was blacklisted at the time and was replaced on the tour by Beulah actress Ginger Jones, who subsequently also was blacklisted (having earlier been named on the Red Channels blacklist) by CBS. All this political maneuvering meant yet another new Alice was needed.

Jones's replacement was Audrey Meadows, known for her work in the 1951 Broadway musical Top Banana and on the Bob and Ray television show. However, before being cast for CBS, Meadows had to overcome Gleason's reservations about her being too attractive to make a credible Alice. To accomplish this, she hired a photographer to come to her apartment early in the morning and take pictures of her wearing no make-up, clad in a torn housecoat, and with her hair undone. When the pictures were delivered to Gleason, he looked at them and said, "That's our Alice." When it was explained who it was, Gleason reportedly said, "Any dame who has a sense of humor like that deserves the job." With the addition of Meadows the now-iconic "Honeymooners" lineup of Gleason, Carney, Meadows, and Randolph was in place.

The rising popularity of The Honeymooners was reflected in its increasing prominence of the sketches as part of The Jackie Gleason Show variety lineup. During the first season, it appeared on a regular basis (although not weekly) as a series of short sketches ranging in length from seven to thirteen minutes. For the 1953–54 season, the shorter sketches were outnumbered by ones that ran for a half-hour or longer. Playing off its growing popularity, during the 1954–55 season most episodes of The Jackie Gleason Show consisted entirely of The Honeymooners. Fan response became overwhelming. Meadows received hundreds of curtains and aprons in the mail from fans who wanted to help Alice lead a fancier life. By January 1955, The Jackie Gleason Show was competing with—and sometimes beating—I Love Lucy as the most-watched TV show in the United States. Audience members lined up around the block hours in advance to attend the show.

The "Classic 39" episodes
The "Classic 39" episodes of The Honeymooners are the ones that originally aired as a weekly half-hour sitcom on CBS from October 1955 to September 1956.

Before Gleason's initial three-year contract with CBS expired, he was offered a much larger one by CBS and General Motors' Buick division (the carmaker having dropped their sponsorship of Milton Berle's Buick-Berle Show after two seasons on NBC). The three-year contract, reportedly valued at $11 million, was at the time one of the largest in show business history. It called for Gleason to produce 78 filmed episodes of The Honeymooners over two seasons, with an option for a third season of 39 more. He was scheduled to receive $65,000 for each episode ($70,000 per episode in the second season), but had to pay all production costs out of that amount. Art Carney received $3,500 per week, Audrey Meadows $2,000, and Joyce Randolph (who did not appear in every episode) $500 per week. Production for The Honeymooners was handled by Jackie Gleason Enterprises Inc., which also produced the show's lead-in, Stage Show, which starred The Dorsey Brothers. Reportedly, only Audrey Meadows, who later became a banker, received residuals when the "Classic 39" episodes were rebroadcast in syndicated reruns. Her brother Edward, a lawyer, had inserted language to that effect into her contract. However, Joyce Randolph, who played Trixie Norton, did receive royalty payments when the "lost" Honeymooners episodes from the variety shows were released.

The first episode of the new half-hour series aired on Saturday, October 1, 1955, at 8.30 pm Eastern Time (during prime time), opposite Ozark Jubilee on ABC and The Perry Como Show on NBC. Because it was sponsored by Buick, the opening credits originally ended with a sponsor identification by announcer Jack Lescoulie ("Brought to you by ... your Buick dealer. And, away we go!"), and the show concluded with a brief Gleason sales pitch for the company, all common practices at the time. However, all references to the carmaker were removed when the show entered syndication in 1957, although "And, away we go!" was a phrase Gleason frequently used in various shows and is inscribed at his gravesite as his memorial catchphrase.

The initial critical reaction to the half-hour sitcom Honeymooners was mixed. The New York Times and Broadcasting & Telecasting Magazine wrote that it was "labored" and lacked the spontaneity of the live sketches. But TV Guide praised it as "rollicking," "slapsticky" and "fast-paced." In February 1956, the show was moved to the 8 p.m. (EST) timeslot, but already had begun losing viewers to the hugely popular Perry Como Show. Gleason's writers also had begun to feel confined by the restrictive half-hour format—in previous seasons, Honeymooners sketches typically ran 35 minutes or more—and Gleason felt they were beginning to run out of original ideas. So, after just one season, Gleason and CBS agreed to cancel The Honeymooners, which aired its 39th and last original episode on September 22, 1956. In explaining his decision to end the show with $7 million remaining on his contract Gleason said, "The excellence of the material could not be maintained, and I had too much fondness for the show to cheapen it.” Gleason subsequently sold the films of the "Classic 39" episodes of the show to CBS for $1.5 million.

Production

In 1955, many television shows (including The Jackie Gleason Show) were performed live and recorded using kinescope technology, though sitcoms already largely were recorded on film, e.g., Amos 'n' Andy, The Adventures of Ozzie and Harriet, My Little Margie, and I Married Joan. I Love Lucy, which was recorded directly onto 35mm film, had influenced television production companies to produce directly on film. For The Honeymooners, Gleason utilized the Electronicam TV-film system, developed by DuMont in the early 1950s, which allowed for a live performance to be directly captured on film. As a result of the superior picture and sound quality afforded by the system, episodes of The Honeymooners were much more suitable for rebroadcast than were most other "live" shows of the era.

All 39 episodes of The Honeymooners were filmed at the DuMont Television Network's Adelphi Theatre at 152 West 54th Street in Manhattan, in front of an audience of 1,000. Episodes were never fully rehearsed because Gleason felt rehearsals would rob the show of its spontaneity. A result was that, while the cast was able to bring a fresh approach to the material, mistakes often were made. Lines either were recited incorrectly or altogether forgotten, and actors did not always follow the scripted action directions. To compensate, the cast developed visual cues for each other. For example, Gleason patted his stomach when he forgot a line, while Meadows would glance at the icebox when someone else was supposed to retrieve something from it.

In contrast to other popular comedies of the era (such as Father Knows Best, Leave It to Beaver, and The Adventures of Ozzie and Harriet), which depicted their characters in comfortable, middle class suburban environments, Richard Rychtarik's set design for The Honeymooners reflected the blue collar existence of its characters. The Kramdens lived in a small, painfully sparsely furnished two-room apartment (the main set) in a tenement building at least four stories high (the Kramdens were on the third floor and the Nortons' were one floor above them), badly aired and with insufficient lighting. They used the single main room as the kitchen, dining and living room. It consisted of a functional table and chairs, a plain chest of drawers, a curtainless window with a view of a fire escape, a noisy sink, and an outdated icebox. The Kramdens' bedroom never was seen, although in the episode about Ed Norton's sleepwalking the Nortons' bedroom is. One of the few other sitcoms about a blue-collar family was The Life of Riley, whose first season (1949–50) had featured Jackie Gleason in the lead role, although veteran movie actor William Bendix, who had originated the role of Chester A. Riley on the radio show and played it in a movie version, thereafter took over the role on television.

The instrumental theme song for The Honeymooners, called "You're My Greatest Love," was composed by Gleason and performed by an orchestra led by Ray Bloch—who previously had been the orchestra leader on Gleason's variety show, as well as The Ed Sullivan Show. Although lyrics were composed, they were never sung. Sammy Spear, who later became Gleason's musical director, provided the arrangement. The music heard in the episodes was not performed during the show, so to enhance the feeling of a live performance for the studio audience an orchestra performed before filming and during breaks. The show's original announcer was Jack Lescoulie, who also was a spokesman for the sponsor, Buick. For the non-sponsored syndicated version, the introduction was voiced by CBS staff announcer Gaylord Avery.

Revivals
On September 29, 1956, one week after The Honeymooners ended as a weekly 30-minute series, The Jackie Gleason Show returned. The "Honeymooners" was brought back as part of the revived variety show. Many of these episodes were, for the first time, produced as original musicals with music and lyrics by Lyn Duddy and Jerry Bresler. The stories featured the Kramdens and Nortons touring Europe after winning a contest. Live musicals had become extremely popular on live television in the mid-fifties due to the success of the 1954 and 1955 live broadcasts of Mary Martin in Peter Pan as well as several Max Leibman original musicals.

In 1959, TV Guide magazine mentioned Gleason's interest in producing new Honeymooners shows. This did not happen for several years, but he did team up with Art Carney to revive an old Honeymooners scene for an October 1960 CBS special called The Big Sell, poking fun at US salespeople.

After the spectacular failure of Gleason's 1961 game show You're in the Picture, and the relative success of the eight-episode talk show that Gleason used to fill its time slot, Gleason's variety show returned in 1962 under the title Jackie Gleason and His American Scene Magazine. The "Honeymooners" sketches returned as part of that show whenever Carney was available. However, Audrey Meadows and Joyce Randolph were replaced as Alice and Trixie by Sue Ane Langdon and Patricia Wilson, respectively, for two sketches.

In January 1966, Meadows again returned on Gleason's American Scene Magazine variety series as Alice for The Honeymooners: The Adoption, a re-enactment of a 1955 non-musical sketch of the same name with original songs added by Duddy and Bresler. 

When The Jackie Gleason Show, by then based in Gleason's relocated headquarters in Miami Beach, Florida, returned in 1966, the "Honeymooners" sketches, in color for the first time, featured Sheila MacRae and Jane Kean in, respectively, the roles of Alice and Trixie, because Audrey Meadows and Joyce Randolph declined to relocate to Miami. Gleason raised no objections to recasting but was adamant that the Ed Norton role never be played by anyone other than Art Carney.  

The 1966 videotaped Honeymooners were also musical episodes, covering 10 of the first season's thirty-two shows. Most of these were updated remakes of 1956-57 musical episodes with songs by Duddy and Bresler, expanded with new material. These programs were syndicated for local stations as The Honeymooners Go To Europe and released on DVD as The Color Honeymooners, the latter being the general term assigned to them.

One notable 1967 segment featured the return of Pert Kelton (in one of her last performances before her death in 1968 of heart disease at the age of 61), but this time she played Alice's mother, Mrs. Gibson.

The Honeymooners ended again when CBS announced the cancellation of The Jackie Gleason Show on February 16, 1970, the result of a disagreement in direction between Gleason and the network. Gleason wanted to continue interspersing "The Honeymooners" within the confines of his regular variety show, while CBS wanted a full-hour "Honeymooners" every week. (CBS's ongoing effort to move its product toward younger audiences and away from established variety show stars was another potential factor in the show's demise.) On October 11, 1973, Gleason, Carney, MacRae and Kean reunited for a "Honeymooners" skit called "Women's Lib" as part of a Gleason special on CBS. The Kramdens and Nortons were brought back for four final one-hour specials on ABC, which aired from 1976 to 1978. Alongside Gleason and Carney, Audrey Meadows returned as Alice. Meanwhile, Jane Kean continued to play Trixie. (Joyce Randolph, the actress most identified as Trixie, never played the part again after the 1950s.) These four specials came at a time when Gleason and Carney were each achieving new-found expanded fame, with Gleason's prominent role in the box office smash Smokey and the Bandit and Carney winning an Academy Award for his leading role in Harry and Tonto, which brought some more attention to these series of specials. These were the final original "Honeymooners" productions.

Awards
Art Carney won five Emmy Awards for his portrayal of Ed Norton—two for the original Jackie Gleason Show, one for The Honeymooners, and two for the final version of The Jackie Gleason Show. He was nominated for another two (in 1957 and 1966), but lost. Gleason and Meadows both were nominated in 1956 for their work on The Honeymooners. Gleason was nominated for Best Actor–Continuing Performance, but lost to Phil Silvers, while Meadows was nominated for Best Actress-Supporting Role but lost to Nanette Fabray. Meadows also was nominated for Emmys for her portrayal of Alice Kramden in 1954 and 1957.

The following table summarizes award wins by cast members, both for The Honeymooners and The Jackie Gleason Show.

Broadcast history

Episodes ("Classic 39")

Syndication and home media releases
The Honeymooners gained its greatest fame in syndication, where it has aired continually since its original cancellation. WPIX in New York City has aired the series for more than five decades (after initially running in 1957–1958 on WRCA-TV, which now is WNBC), with occasional brief breaks. It regularly airs on WPIX with a marathon that begins on the final hour of New Year's Eve and runs well into New Year's Day. In the United Kingdom it originally aired on ITV between 1958–1963. BBC Two aired 38 of the original 39 episodes beginning in 1989 and ending in 1991. The show also has aired in Australia, Iran, Nigeria, Saudi Arabia, Ireland, and Suriname. It previously was seen on WGN America from June 2008 to September 2009 and on Me-TV from December 2010 to September 2011. In April 2012, the show returned to Me-TV. The show currently airs on the network on Sunday nights.

In 1984, the Museum of Television and Radio announced the "discovery" of four original Honeymooners sketches from the original series The Jackie Gleason Show. Later, when they held a public viewing for three of them the response was overwhelmingly positive. In January 1985, Gleason announced the release of an additional group of "lost" episodes from his private vault. As with the previously released sketches, these "lost episodes" actually were kinescopes of sketches from the 1952–55, 1956–57 run of The Jackie Gleason Show. Because the prints had not been stored under ideal conditions, parts of the soundtracks of three episodes were unusable, and the voices had to be redubbed. Gleason personally approved the soundalike actors, with noted voice actor Joe Alaskey providing Kramden's lines.

Gleason sold the broadcast rights to the so-called "lost" episodes to Viacom, and they first were aired from 1985–1986 as a series of sixty-eight 22-minute episodes on the Showtime cable network. They since have joined the original 39 episodes in syndication, and also have been released on VHS and DVD. In September 2004, another "lost" episode reportedly was discovered at the Peabody Award archives in Georgia. This episode, titled "Love Letter," originally aired on The Jackie Gleason Show on October 16, 1954. It aired for the first time since then on October 16, 2004, its 50th anniversary, on TVLand. CBS Media Ventures (the modern-day successor to Viacom), via CBS Broadcasting, owns the "Classic 39" series outright, while the Gleason estate owns the "lost episodes" (although CMV does distribute them).

Paramount Home Entertainment/CBS DVD released the six-disc DVD box set The Honeymooners "Classic 39" Episodes in November 2003 (only available in Region 1). The set contains all 39 episodes from the series' original 1955–56 broadcast run. Also included in the set is an edited version of a 1990 anniversary special hosted by Audrey Meadows, as well as original show openings and closings sponsored by Buick that were removed when the show went into syndication.

MPI Home Video released 80 of the "lost episodes" in Region 1 DVD format during 2001–02, spread out on 24 single-disc volumes. MPI subsequently re-packaged the 24 volumes into six 4-disc box sets. Both the 24 individual volumes and the six 4-disc box sets went out of print during the course of 2008. However, MPI has since renewed its deal with Jackie Gleason Enterprises LLC and has continued to release new editions of the "lost episodes" and other Honeymooners material not currently owned by CBS. On July 28, 2011, MPI Home Video announced the release of a completely restored set of all existing Honeymooners Lost Episodes from 1951 to 1957. The 50-hour, 15 DVD set would contain 107 Honeymooners sketches, included the home video debut of the nine existing original DuMont Network sketches, six other sketches never before released on home video and the eight musical Honeymooners episodes from 1957, which are collectively known as the "Trip To Europe" shows that have been long sought after by Honeymooners fans. The new restored set of Lost Episodes was released on October 4, 2011, sixty years after the first Honeymooners sketch aired.

In June 2006, MPI Home Video released The Color Honeymooners – Collection 1 (NTSC and PAL), which collects the "Trip to Europe" story arc presented on The Jackie Gleason Show in 1966. It has since released an additional three volumes featuring additional episodes from this story arc. AmericanLife TV Network has also aired The Color Honeymooners shows under license from Gleason Enterprises and Paul Brownstein Productions.

In May 2022, MPI Home Video released Jackie Gleason TV Treasures, which includes three never before released Honeymooners sketches from the early 1960's, the 1966 musical remake of The Adoption Honeymooners episode, and seven color Honeymooners episodes not included in previous Color Honeymooners Collections.

Paramount and CBS Home Entertainment released the 39 episodes on Blu-ray Disc in March 2014.

In Australia (Region 4), Shock Entertainment released "The Honeymooners - Classic 39 Episodes" 5-Disc Set in NTSC format on November 13, 2009, and a re-release on August 5, 2020.

Impact
Steven Sheehan explains the popularity of The Honeymooners as the embodiment of working-class masculinity in the character of Ralph Kramden, and postwar ideals in American society regarding work, housing, consumerism, and consumer satisfaction. The series visually demonstrated the burdens of material obligations and participation in consumer culture, as well as the common use of threats—even though The Honeymooners never showed or even hinted at actual violence—of domestic violence in working class households.

 In 1997, the episodes "The $99,000 Answer" and "TV or Not TV" were respectively ranked No. 6 and No. 26 on "TV Guides 100 Greatest Episodes of All Time".
 In 1999, TV Guide published a list titled "TV's 100 Greatest Characters Ever!" Ed Norton was No. 20, and Ralph Kramden was No. 2.
 In 2002, The Honeymooners was listed at No. 3 on TV Guides 50 Greatest TV Shows of All Time.
 On June 1, 2007, FOX aired a TV's Funniest Moments special, in which a clip from the episode "The $99,000 Answer" was on the list. In the clip, Ralph lamely identifies the composer of "Swanee River" as being "Ed Norton".
 In 2013, TV Guide ranked The Honeymooners No. 13 on their list of the 60 Greatest Shows of All Time.
 The instrument used for Visible/Infrared Imaging by NASA on the New Horizons space probe was named after Ralph Kramden, in parallel to the Alice instrument (naming not related to the TV show) that was used on the Rosetta mission

Legacy
Due to its enduring popularity, The Honeymooners has been referenced numerous times in American pop culture, and has served as the inspiration for other television shows, most notably The Flintstones. The show also introduced memorable catchphrases into American culture, such as "Bang, zoom, straight to the Moon!", "One of these days... one of these days...," "Homina, homina, homina," and "Baby, you're the greatest".

The Flintstones
In 1960, the Hanna-Barbera-produced animated sitcom The Flintstones debuted on ABC. Many critics and viewers noted the close resemblance of that show's premise and characters to that of The Honeymooners. In various interviews over the years, creators and founders of their production company William Hanna and Joseph Barbera each stated that The Honeymooners was one of the inspirations for The Flintstones. Gleason later said that he considered suing, but decided that becoming known as "the guy who yanked Fred Flintstone off the air" was not worth the negative publicity. Historically, The Honeymooners itself was compared in its day to the similar comedy series The Bickersons as well as Laurel and Hardy (particularly Sons of the Desert), and while The Flintstones made no secret of hiring some of the writers and being inspired by the premise, The Flintstones original series and its spinoffs changed over the years, ultimately having more differences than similarities, starting with its setting and artistic approach.

Spoofs, parodies and importation

 In the Futurama episode "The Series Has Landed", Ralph Kramden is believed to have been an early astronaut, due to his catchphrase (which Fry protests was "a metaphor for beating his wife".)
In the episode "Spanish Fry" of the same show, Lrrr says, "One of these days, Ndnd, bang! zoom! straight to the third moon of Omicron Persei 8!!"
 The Moonlighting episode "A Trip To The Moon" contains a lengthy parody of The Honeymooners as The Bluemooners, with Bruce Willis as Ralph, Charles Rocket as Norton, Allyce Beasley as Trixie, and Cybill Shepherd as Alice.
 The sitcom The King of Queens was partially inspired by The Honeymooners.
 The show was parodied in a series of animated Looney Tunes shorts, in which the principal characters, Ralph and Alice Crumden and Ned and Trixie Morton, are depicted as mice and Ralph's "big dream" is to get enough cheese to impress Alice. These cartoons are The Honey-Mousers (1956), Cheese It, the Cat! (1957), and Mice Follies (1960). The Sylvester and Tweety short Red Riding Hoodwinked (1955) has the usually-cheerful Granny character taking on the role of blustery, female Ralph. Ralph and Ed are caricatured as train-riding hoboes and pitted against Bugs Bunny in the 1956 Warner cartoon Half-Fare Hare. And in another Sylvester-Tweety cartoon, A Bird in a Bonnet (1958), when Sylvester falls into an open manhole, inside a voice like Ed Norton's says, "Whoo-hoo-hoo! Hey, look at this, Ralph, a pussycat."  To which Sylvester simply peers out of the sewer to the audience.
 The writer/comic Louis C.K. stated in an interview that he based the layout of Louie's apartment in the HBO show Lucky Louie  on the Kramdens' apartment, in contrast to other shows such as The King of Queens that have very nicely decorated apartments despite the characters' professed low incomes.
 Stan Freberg created a brief audio skit titled "The Honeyearthers," in which Ralph, Alice, Norton, and Trixie are aliens living on the moon. In keeping with the 1950s ideas of what aliens would look like, they have two heads, one eye, one ear, four hands, three feet and antennae.  Ralph drives a rocket ship and Norton works in a "green cheese mine."  At the end of the skit, Ralph offers to take Alice on a "honeyearth" to renew their marriage.
In Back to the Future (1985) Lorraine's (Lea Thompson) father (George DiCenzo) wheels their newly acquired television set in front of the family table, saying giddily: "Now we can watch Jackie Gleason while we eat!" – a reference to the TV series. Scenes from the episode "The Man from Space" are also shown even though that particular scene was set on November 5, 1955 – the day "The Sleepwalker" aired.
 In the 21 Jump Street season 3 episode "High High" (where the Jump Street team is assigned to go undercover at a performing arts school), Doug Penhall cites The Honeymooners as one of his favorite shows growing up. Towards the end, he reenacts a scene from the episode "Young Man with a Horn" for acting class.
 The Honeymooners was spoofed in an episode of Perfect Strangers as a result of the character Balki Bartoukomos (Bronson Pinchot)'s spinning an extended metaphor about the characters' existential situation to an episode of The Honeymooners he had once seen; Balki's description of the episode is shown in a black-and-white flashback.
 As Ralph Kramden was a New York City bus driver, one of the service depots in Brooklyn was renamed the Jackie Gleason Bus Depot in 1988. All buses that originate from the bus depot bear a sticker on the front that has a logo derived from the "face on the Moon" opening credits of The Honeymooners. The MTA also took 1948 GM-TDH5101 bus number 4789, renumbered it to 2969 and made it the 'official Jackie Gleason bus'.
 A statue of Gleason as Ralph Kramden stands at the Eighth Avenue entrance to the Port Authority Bus Terminal in New York City. The plaque on the base of the statue reads, "Jackie Gleason as Ralph Kramden — Bus Driver — Raccoon Lodge Treasurer — Dreamer — Presented by the People of TV Land"
The Toronto Coach Terminal included a restaurant and bar named Kramden's Kafe from 1990 until 2013.
 An episode of The Simpsons, "The Ten-Per-Cent Solution", includes a fictional rip-off of The Honeymooners called The Adventures of Fatso Flannigan.
 In 2011, an adult parody titled The Honeymoaners was released by DreamZone Entertainment, with Peter O'Tole as Ralph and Anthony Rosano as Ed. Both actors also played Fred and Barney in The Flintstones – A XXX Parody, an adult parody of the Flintstones, which have a resemblance to the show (as mentioned above). The plot of the parody is similar to the episode "The $99,000 Answer", only here the show is called "The $69,000 Answer" and Ralph is answering questions about sex.
 The Honeymooners was spoofed in episode 22 of the first season of Saturday Night Live (then known as NBC's Saturday Night) in a sketch featuring The Killer Bees (referenced as 'The Bees' in this particular episode). John Belushi took the role of Ralph, with Gilda Radner as Alice, Dan Aykroyd as Norton, and Jane Curtin as Trixie.
 The first adult film parody of the show, Honeymooners, premiered in 1976 and starred John Leslie as the Ralph Kramden character.
 In 1988 Ron Jeremy led a cast of adult performers in the critically panned The Horneymooners.
 The Honeymooners was partly the inspiration for the Nickelodeon series Kenan and Kel.

Adaptations and remakes
The success of The Honeymooners in countries outside the United States has led to the production of new shows based entirely on it.

International remakes

Two series, 26 episodes in all were made for R.C.T.I. in 1996. It was the first sitcom of that style ever attempted in Indonesia. It was titled Detak Detik (Ticking Seconds) and starred Mat Sola as the Jackie Gleason character. Art Carney rang the cast prior to production to give them his best wishes. It was decided to make Mat Sola a Silver Bird taxi driver, as they had a bit more prestige in Indonesia. They left Nurbuat, who mirrored Ed Norton, as a sewerage worker. The chemistry worked well. The series had to remove any references to alcohol, as Indonesia is a country with a Muslim majority population.

French Canada was entertained for years in the 1960s and '70s by a sitcom titled Cré Basile, with Olivier Guimond, Béatrice Picard, Denis Drouin and Amulette Garneau, which was an uncredited Quebecois version of The Honeymooners. It could, by contemporary standards, qualify as plagiarism.

In 1994, the Dutch broadcasting network KRO produced a version of The Honeymooners titled Toen Was Geluk Heel Gewoon (Then happiness was common), using translated scripts of the original series but changing its setting to 1950s Rotterdam. After the original 39 scripts were exhausted, the series' lead actors, Gerard Cox and Sjoerd Pleijsier, took over writing, adding many new characters and references to Dutch history and popular culture. The series was a hit in the Netherlands and it finished its run after 16 years and 229 episodes in June 2009. The actors reprised their characters five years later in a feature-length movie.

In 1994, the Swedish network TV4 produced a version of The Honeymooners titled Rena Rama Rolf, but changing its setting to contemporary Gothenburg, where Rolf (Ralph), played by Lasse Brandeby, is working as a streetcar driver. The show ran until 1998.

In 1998, the Polish network Polsat produced a version of The Honeymooners titled Miodowe lata which translates to "Honey years", using both translated scripts of the original series and new ones, but changing its setting to modern-day Warsaw. The original series ran until 2003 and was continued in 2004 as Całkiem nowe lata miodowe.

Comics
Vince Musacchia created a comic book series based on The Honeymooners for Hypergraphics between 1987 and 1989.

Film
On June 10, 2005, a feature film remake of The Honeymooners was released, featuring a predominantly African American cast. The roles of Ralph, Alice, Ed, and Trixie were played by Cedric the Entertainer, Gabrielle Union, Mike Epps, and Regina Hall, respectively. The movie was a critical and commercial failure, earning slightly more than US$13 million worldwide. The film was released by Paramount Pictures.

Video game
In 1988, First Row Software released a Honeymooners computer game for the Commodore 64 and DOS systems. The game involves the Kramdens and Nortons trying to earn $223 for train fare to Miami Beach, where Ralph wants to host the annual Raccoon Lodge convention, by playing a variety of mini-games related to the series. Additionally, players have the option of trying to double their money after each round by answering a Honeymooners-related question in a bonus round based on "The $99,000 Answer" episode.

Reboots
In December 2016, a CBS reboot of The Honeymooners with Bob Kushell writing and executive producing the series was announced but it never came to fruition. Producers Sarah Timberman, Carl Beverly, Eric & Kim Tannenbaum, and Jeff Greenstein were also announced as part of the development deal.

In January 2022, a CBS reboot of The Honeymooners with Damon Wayans Jr. executive producing the series was announced.

Musical
In September 2017, Paper Mill Playhouse produced the world-premiere of a musical adaptation of The Honeymooners, starring Michael McGrath as Ralph, Michael Mastro as Ed, Leslie Kritzer as Alice, and Laura Bell Bundy as Trixie. The musical had a book by Dusty Kay and Bill Nuss, with music by Stephen Weiner and lyrics by Peter Mills. It was directed by John Rando and choreographed by Joshua Bergasse.

Further reading
 
 Katsigeorgis, John (2002). To the Moon: The Honeymooners Book of Trivia – Official Authorized Edition. Metrobooks. .
 McCrohan, Donna and Peter Crescenti (1986). The Honeymooners Lost Episodes. Workman Publishing. .
 
 Meadows, Audrey (1994). Love, Alice: My Life as a Honeymooner. Crown Publishers. .

References

External links

 History of and photos from The Honeymooners
 The Honeymooners @ pearson.tv
 

 
1955 American television series debuts
1956 American television series endings
1950s American sitcoms
American television spin-offs
Black-and-white American television shows
Brooklyn in fiction
CBS original programming
Culture of Brooklyn
English-language television shows
Fictional married couples
Mass media portrayals of the working class
Television series about marriage
Television series by CBS Studios
Television shows set in Brooklyn
Television shows adapted into comics
Television shows adapted into films
Television shows adapted into video games
Television series based on comedy sketches
Television shows filmed in New York (state)
Television shows filmed in New York City